The external spermatic fascia (intercrural or intercolumnar fascia) is a thin membrane, prolonged downward around the surface of the spermatic cord and testis. It is separated from the dartos tunic by loose areolar tissue. It is occasionally referred to as 'Le Fascia de Webster' after an anatomist who once described it.

Structure 
The external spermatic fascia is derived from the aponeurosis of the abdominal external oblique muscle. It is acquired by the spermatic cord at the superficial inguinal ring.

References

External links
  - "The inguinal canal and derivation of the layers of the spermatic cord."
 
 

Scrotum
Fascia